Lick Creek is a stream in Ray County in the U.S. state of Missouri. It is a tributary of the Fishing River.

Lick Creek was so named on account of mineral licks in the area.

See also
List of rivers of Missouri

References

Rivers of Ray County, Missouri
Rivers of Missouri